Eastington is a village and civil parish in the Gloucestershire, England. It lies 4 miles west of Stroud and 9 miles south of Gloucester at the entrance to the Stroud Valley. It is west of the town of Stonehouse and south of Junction 13 of the M5 motorway and the A38 and A419 roads. Since the M5 and its access roads were opened, the main road no longer runs through the village.

Community
Eastington parish includes farms and former mills. The village contains retail outlets including a Co-op incorporating a post office, a butchers, two pubs, two hairdressers, and a garage. At nearby Claypits there is a farm shop and a coach company. There is a community centre with sports field, and a village hall. The local primary school provides for about 140 pupils, and is situated adjacent to the Church of England St Michael and All Angel's at Churchend. There is  also a Methodist church.

The nature reserve of Five Acre Grove lies east of the parish in Leonard Stanley, and is designated a Key Wildlife Site (KWS).

The village is part of 'Eastington and Standish' electoral ward, which starts in the south-west at Eastington and follows the M5 motorway north-eastwards to Standish. The total ward population taken at the 2011 census was 1,794.

References

External links

Eastington, from Elrington et al. (1972), A History of the County of Gloucester: Volume 10, pp. 123–139. Victoria County History series, via British History Online
GENUKI(tm) index page for Eastington
Eastington Primary School web site
Owen Harris Sports and Playing Fields Website
Keep Eastington Rural Website
 Stroud Voices (Eastington filter) - oral history site

Villages in Gloucestershire
Stroud District
Civil parishes in Gloucestershire